The Barmera-Monash Football Club is an Australian rules football club which competes in the Riverland Football League. The club was formed in 1957 following a merger between the Monash and Barmera clubs who both played in Upper Murray Football League. The club developed a reputation as a bridesmaid as it lost the first nine grand finals it played in.

Premierships
1921, 1983, 1984, 1985, 1986, 1987, 1989, 2012

References

External links 
 RFL League Website

Australian rules football clubs established in 1957
1957 establishments in Australia
Australian rules football clubs in South Australia